Ziegenkopf (Habichtswald) is a mountain of Hesse, Germany.

Mountains of Hesse